Deby Callihan was a World Series of Poker champion in the 1980 $400 Ladies - Limit 7 Card Stud event.

As of 2008, her total WSOP tournament winnings exceed $14,880.

World Series of Poker bracelets

References

American poker players
World Series of Poker bracelet winners
Female poker players
Year of birth missing (living people)
Living people